Yanwath is a village in the Eden District of Cumbria, England, 1 mile south of Penrith.

There is a primary school at Yanwath, with 192 pupils.

Yanwath Gate Inn, in the centre of the village, dates from the 17th century.  It is a Grade II listed building.

Half a mile north-west of the village, Yanwath Hall is a fortified tower house.  Its oldest parts were built in the late 14th century.  It is a Grade I listed building.

Railway explosion
The West Coast Main Line runs near Yanwath. It was on this stretch of railway that a disastrous explosion occurred only 21 years after its opening, in 1867. On the night of 26 February that year a goods train, running late from Tebay, derailed. One of its wagons, carrying two tons of gunpowder, ended up on the opposite track, and moments later, another goods train collided with the gunpowder wagon and caused an explosion. Both the driver and fireman of the latter goods train died. The explosion blew out windows, felled telegraph wires, and caused debris to rain down on Yanwath. Miraculously, there were no further deaths or injuries.

References

External links
 Cumbria County History Trust: Yanwath and Eamont Bridge (nb: provisional research only – see Talk page)

Villages in Cumbria
Westmorland
1867 disasters in the United Kingdom
1867 in England
Explosions in 1867